Italia 1 (Italian pronunciation ) is an Italian free-to-air television channel on the Mediaset network, owned by MFE - MediaForEurope. It is oriented at both young and adult people.

Italia 1 was launched on 3 January 1982 and, originally, was owned by Rusconi; after a few months, however, due to the aggressive dumping practices of Silvio Berlusconi's rival network Canale 5, Rusconi was forced to sell the majority of his company to Fininvest, allowing Berlusconi to further strengthen his media holdings.

History

Launch (1982–1983)
Launched 3 January 1982 by print media editor Edilio Rusconi, Italia 1 was born from the idea of a network supported by twenty regional broadcasting stations, some owned by Rusconi himself and others simply affiliated to broadcast throughout Italian territory on the 'ploy' of interconnection. The lead broadcasting station is Milan-based Antenna Nord, but Rome's Quinta Rete also has an important role. Lillo Tombolini is the executive director. The channel's presenter is a young Gabriella Golia, who was already the face of Antenna Nord. 
Rusconi's growing national channel starts its programming at noon, with a segment dedicated to children, during which various cartoons and anime series (particularly western cartoons) are broadcast, as well as successful original television series, such as Star Trek, then in the early afternoon air-time is given to region-specific broadcasts, later restarting the national broadcast with more television series and the mid-afternoon 80's and 90's children's programming block, Bim Bum Bam (offering episodes from numerous cartoon series, predominantly more American and European, such as The Smurfs, Snorks, Count Duckula, Police Academy, Iznogoud, Inspector Gadget, Batman: The Animated Series, and Spiff and Hercules, and less Japanese). In the late afternoon the channel again broadcasts from local stations and an hour later airs a television series episode (such as Paper Moon). Generally, in the early evening two films and one television series is broadcast. The network also offers plenty of air-time to sport programs dedicated to soccer, boxing, basketball and motor racing, including Andrea De Adamich's Grand Prix.
Prime time hours were dedicated to predominantly American imports such as Falcon Crest, Kojak, The Big Valley, Project UFO, and Mork & Mindy. On 23 April 1982 an official agreement was made between Gruppo Rusconi and the American network CBS for technical assistance and program sharing. 
However, only a few months after its appearance on a national scale funds began to dwindle, mostly due to exorbitant costs of managing broadcast transmission systems, something a print editing house such as Rusconi probably wasn't aware of, but also due to the aggressive advertising policy from its main rival network, Canale 5. In fact, Rusconi's network relied on an external advertising provider, la Publikompass, to sell advertising space while Berlusconi's channel took advantage of owning its own advertising provider, Publitalia, which could easily personalize ad packages to clients using dumping practices. 
On 6 September 1982 Rusconi signed a collaboration agreement with Silvio Berlusconi, the owner of Canale 5, mainly focusing on a common policy for the management of advertising limits but also concerning the communal use of high frequency networks and the sharing of some programs.
However, on 30 November of that same year, the Rusconi group are forced to sell the network for about 29 billion lire (approximately €15 Million) to Berlusconi, who merges it with "Rete 10", also owned by Berlusconi, to found the new Italia 1, that according to the Fininvest company is oriented for a young audience.

Audience

Share 24h* Italia 1 
Below, average monthly listening data in the total day received by the issuer.
 

Average Monthly Day on Target Individuals 4+

List of programming

North American TV series (premieres and replicas)
 15/Love
 24 (from season 5 – the previous seasons aired on Rete 4)
 3rd Rock from the Sun (Una famiglia del terzo tipo) (1999–2005)
 7th Heaven (Settimo Cielo)
 According to Jim (La vita secondo Jim)
 Ally McBeal
 Angel
A.P. Bio
 Arrested Development (Ti presento i miei...)
 Arrow (seasons 1-5)
 Automan
 Barney & Friends (Barney) (1997)
Batwoman
 Baywatch
 Baywatch Hawaii
 Beverly Hills, 90210 (1992–2001)
 Bionic Woman (2007)
Black-ish
Blindspot (TV series) (s.1)
 Blue Water High (2006–2010)
Bones (TV series)
 Boston Public
 Bratz (20062007; Episodes 133)
Brooklyn Nine-Nine
 Buffy, the Vampire Slayer (Buffy l'Ammazzavampiri) (2000–2005)
 Californication (2008–present)
Chicago Fire 
Chicago P.D.
Chicago Med
 CHiPs (1982–1989)
 Chuck
 Cory in the House (Cory alla Casa Bianca) 
 CSI: Crime Scene Investigation (CSI: Scena del crimine)
 CSI: Miami
 CSI: NY
 Dawson's Creek (2000–2003)
Legends of Tomorrow
 Dexter 
Dharma & Greg
 Diff'rent Strokes (Arnold) (1984–1990)
 Drake & Josh (2009)
 Everwood
 The Facts of Life (L'albero delle mele) (1984-1995)
 Family Matters (8 sotto un tetto) (1992–2001)
 FlashForward (2010)
FBI: Most Wanted (2021)
 Flipper (Le nuove avventure di Flipper)
 Fringe 
 Full House (Gli amici di papà) (1996–2002)
 Genie in the House (Genio sul Divano)
 Gilmore Girls (Una mamma per amica)
 Gimme a Break! (La piccola grande Nell) (1986-1995)
 Glee
God Friended Me
 Gossip Girl
 Grey's Anatomy
 Growing Pains (Genitori in blue jeans) (1989–1996)
Grown-ish (2021)
 H2O: Just Add Water (2008–2010)
Hart of Dixie
 Hannah Montana 
 Happy Days (1982–1991)
 Heroes (season 1)
 House (Dr. House – Medical Division) – seasons 1–2 and first 15 episodes of season 3 – the remaining episodes aired on Canale 5.
 How I Met Your Mother (How I Met Your Mother – E alla fine arriva mamma)
 iCarly (seasons 1-2)
 Instant Star
 Jonas
 Joan of Arcadia (2006)
 Killer Instinct
 Kingdom Hospital
 Knight Rider (Supercar) (1987–1992)
 Kyle XY
Last Man Standing
Law & Order: Special Victims Unit
Legacies (TV series)
Lethal Weapon
 Life (2008–present)
 Life Goes On (Una famiglia come tante)
 Living with Fran (A casa di Fran) (2006–2007)
 Lizzie McGuire (2003–2008)
Lucifer (TV series)
 MacGyver (1988–1996)
 Magnum, P.I. (1982–1990)
Magnum P.I. (2018 TV series) (seasons 1-2, free-to-air transmission)
 Major Dad (Agli ordini papà)
 Malcolm in the Middle (Malcolm) (2004–2008)
 Manimal
 Melrose Place (1996–2003)
 Mighty Morphin Power Rangers (Power Rangers) (1996–2000)
Mike & Molly
 Millennium (2000–2004)
Miracle Workers
Modern Family
Mom (TV series)
 My Secret Identity (Il mio amico Ultraman) (1991–1995)
 My Name is Earl (Il mio nome è Earl)
 My Wife and Kids (Tutto in famiglia)
 Nash Bridges (1999–2003)
NCIS (TV series) 
 Ned's Declassified School Survival Guide (Ned, scuola di sopravvivenza)
 Nip/Tuck (seasons 1-4)
 Oz
 Pacific Blue
 Phil of the Future (Phil dal futuro) (2007)
 Power Rangers 
 Pinky And The Brain (mignolo e il cervello)
 Prison Break (2006–2009)
 Roseanne (Pappa e Ciccia)
Riverdale
 Rosie
 Relic Hunter
 Renegade (1995–2000)
 Royal Pains
 Sabrina, the Teenage Witch (Sabrina, vita da strega) (1998–2004)
 Saved by the Bell (Bayside School) (1992–1997)
 Six Feet Under
 Smallville (2002–present)
 Small Wonder (Super Vicky) (1988–1992)
 Sonny With a Chance (Sonny tra le Stelle)
 Stacked (Una pupa in libreria)
 Step by Step (Una bionda per papà) (1994–2001)
 Street Hawk (Street Hawk – Il falco della strada)
 Summerland
 Supergirl (season 2)
Superstore (TV series)
 Sweet Valley High
 Taken
 Terminator: The Sarah Connor Chronicles
 That's So Raven (Raven) (2006–2007)
 The A-Team (A-Team) (1986–1991)
 The Big Bang Theory (Big Bang Theory)
The Bold Type
 The Dukes of Hazzard (Hazzard) (1983–1990)
 The Flash (Flash)
 The Fresh Prince of Bel Air (Willy il principe di Bel Air) (1992–1999)
The Goldbergs
The Good Place
 The Incredible Hulk (Hulk) (1982–1986)
 The Inside
 The Invisible Man (2003–2006)
 The Jeffersons (I Jefferson) (1982–1990)
 The Mentalist (2009–present)
The Middle (TV series)
 The Nanny (La Tata) (1995–2000)
 The O.C. (2004–2008)
 The Prisoner (Il prigioniero)
 The Shield
 The Six Million Dollar Man (L'Uomo da 6 milioni di Dollari)
 The Sopranos (I Soprano) – only season 6. The previous seasons aired on Canale 5.
 The Suite Life on Deck (Zack e Cody sul ponte di comando) (2010–present)
 The Suite Life of Zack & Cody (Zack e Cody al Grand Hotel) (2007–2009)
 The Vampire Diaries 
 The X-Files (X-Files) (1995–2002)
 Third Watch (Squadra emergenza)
 Thunder in Paradise
 T.J. Hooker (1985–1990)
 Tru Calling
 True Jackson, VP 
 Tiny Toon Adventures (minuscole avventure in toon) (1990-2007)
 Two
 Ugly Betty
 Veronica Mars (2006–2007)
 Walker, Texas Ranger
 White Collar
 Will & Grace
 Wizards of Waverly Place (I maghi di Waverly) (2010–present)
 Wonder Woman (1982–1993)
Young Sheldon
 Zoey 101 (2006–2010)
 The Next Step

Spanish TV series
 Un Paso Adelante (Paso adelante) (2004–2006)

Argentina TV series
 Patito Feo (Il mondo di Patty) (2009–2010)

Italian TV series
 Arriva Cristina
Balliamo e cantiamo con Licia
Belli dentro
Camera Café
Chiara e gli altri
Cri Cri
Cristina (TV series)
Colletti bianchi
Don Tonino
Don Tonino 2
I ragazzi della terza C
La Figlia di Elisa
Le teorie di Adam Kadmon
Licia dolce Licia
Love Bugs
Love me Licia
Medici miei
Prezzemolo
Schillerstraße (Buona la prima!)
 Teneramente Licia
 The Odd Couple (La strana coppia, Italian remake)
 VIA Rebelle (Rebelde Way, Italian remake)

Animated shows
Italia 1 is also famous for broadcasting animated series. The cartoons shown in Italy with regular reruns include:

Ace Ventura: Pet Detective (Ace Ventura)
Action Man
Alf (ALF)
Alfred J. Kwak (Niente paura, c'è Alfred!)
Alvin and the Chipmunks (Alvin rock 'n' roll)
American Dad!
Angela Anaconda
Animaniacs
Around the World with Willy Fog (Il giro mondo di Willy Fog)
Beyblade
Beyblade V-Force
Beyblade G-Revolution
Blue Dragon
Buddy Buddy... A Dog's Life (Sale e Pepe)
Cardcaptor Sakura (Pesca la tua carta Sakura [season 1] and Sakura, la partita non è finita [seasons 2 and 3])
Dr. Slump (reruns season 1 - premiere season 2)
Duckman (first 6 episodes aired)
Attack No. 1 (premiere eps. 26+, 1983)
Attacker You!
Baby Looney Tunes
Bad Dog (Bad Dog un cane che più cane non-c'è)
Batman: The Animated Series (Batman)
Batman: The Brave and the Bold
Beethoven
Ben 10
Bernard (Bernard l'orso)
Beverly Hills Teens (Siamo quelli di Beverly Hills)
Bratz (eps. 1-33/34+ on Hiro)
C.O.P.S. (Cops squadra anticrimine)
Captain N: The Game Master (Un videogioco per Kevin)
Captain Tsubasa (Holly e Benji, due fuoriclasse)
Captain Tsubasa J (Che campioni, Holly e Benji!)
Captain Tsubasa Road to 2002 (Holly e Benji Forever)
Captain Tsubasa (2018 anime series) (Captain Tsubasa)
Casper
Cattivik (Cattivik)
Count Duckula (Conte Dacula)
The Country Mouse and the City Mouse Adventures (Emily e Alexander: Che tipi questi topi)
Creepy Crawlers (La fabbrica dei mostri)
ChalkZone (Zona Gesso)
Ducanville
Denver, the Last Dinosaur (Ti voglio bene Denver)
Dora the Explorer (Dora l'esploratrice)   
Case Closed (Detective Conan) - episodes 1-449 / 491-522 (450 - 490 on Hiro) - subsequents (523 - 542) on Italia 2, Super! (543-723) and TIMvision (724)
Dexter's Laboratory (Il laboratorio di Dexter)
Doraemon (1979 anime series)
Dr. Zitbag's Transylvania Pet Shop (Pazze risate per mostri e vampiri)
Dragon Ball
Dragon Ball Z (What's My Destiny Dragon Ball)
Dragon Ball GT
Dragon Ball Super
Dragon Ball: La saga / Le grandi battaglie - Dragon Ball: The Saga / The Great Battles (is a collection of the best moments from sagas and movies in episodes of 20 mins.)
Family! (Che famiglia è questa Family!)
Family Guy (I Griffin)
Foofur (Foofur superstar)
Franklin (Franklin)
Freakazoid! (Freakazoid)
Fushigi no umi no nadia (1991)
Futurama
Gadget and the Gadgetinis (Gadget e gadgettini)
Jacob Two-Two (Jacob Due Due)
Jōjī!
Garfield and Friends (Garfield e i suoi Amici)
Ghostbusters
Hamtaro
Hanna-Barbera
Heathcliff (Isidoro)
He-Man and the Masters of the Universe
Heidi, Girl of the Alps (Heidi)
Idaten Jump
Inspector Gadget (L'ispettore Gadget)
Iron Man
Iznogoud (Iznogoud – Chi la fa l'aspetti)
Jakers! The Adventures of Piggley Winks (Le avventure di Piggley Winks)
Jewelpet
Kirarin Revolution (Kilari)
Lenzenmer & Kids Another Way Block Rock (Sciocchi della strada)
Looney Tunes
Love Me, My Knight (Kiss me Licia)
Lupin the Third Part I (Le avventure di Lupin III)
Lupin the Third Part II (Le nuove avventure di Lupin III)
Lupin III Part III (Lupin, l'incorreggibile Lupin)
Lupin the 3rd Part IV: The Italian Adventure (Lupin III - L'avventura italiana)
Lupin the 3rd Part V: Misadventures in France (Lupin III - Ritorno alle origini)
Maya, the Bee (L'Apemaia or L'ape Maia)
Kirby: Right Back at Ya! (Kirby)
Kimagure Orange Road (E' quasi magia, Johnny)
Marsupilami
Magical DoReMi (Magica Doremì)
Mermaid Melody Pichi Pichi Pitch (Mermaid Melody - Principesse sirene)
Mr. Magoo
Mucha Lucha!
My Little Pony: Friendship Is Magic (My Little Pony: L'amicizia è magica)
Miracle Tunes
Mirmo!
Naruto
Naruto: Shippuden (episodes 1-286, 287+ on Italia 2)
Ned's Newt (Un tritone per amico)
New Attacker YOU!
Ninja Turtles: The Next Mutation (Tartarughe Ninja – L'avventura continua)
Noddy's Toyland Adventures (benvenuti nella terra dei giocattoli su Noddy)
One Piece (episodes 1-453, 453+ on Italia 2)
Oggy and the Cockroaches (Maledetti Scarafaggi)
Pippi Longstocking (Pippi Calzelunghe)
Popeye (Braccio di Ferro)
Popeye and Son (Che Papà, Braccio di Ferro!)
Pokémon
Police Academy (Scuola di polizia)
Porphy no Nagai Tabi (Il Lungo Viaggio di Porfi)
Potatoes and Dragons (Che Drago di un Drago)
Prezzemolo
Robinson Sucroe (Robinson Bignè)
Rugrats (I Rugrats)
Sailor Moon
Shin Chan
Simsala Grimm (Simsalagrimm) - seasons 1, 2
Sitting Ducks
Sonic the Hedgehog (Sonic)
Sonic Underground
Sonic X
South Park (until the fourth season – subsequent seasons have aired on Comedy Central Italy)
Space Goofs (Space Goofs – Vicini troppo vicini)
Shaman King
Silver Hawks (Falchi d'argento)
Spiff and Hercules (Pippo e Menelao)
SpongeBob SquarePants (SpongeBob)
Stunt Dawgs (Il pericolo è il mio mestiere)
Superman: The Animated Series (Superman)
Sagwa, the Chinese Siamese Cat (Sagwa)
Tales from the Cryptkeeper (Brividi e polvere con Pelleossa)
Taz-Mania (Tazmania)
Teen Titans
Teenage Mutant Ninja Turtles (Tartarughe Ninja alla riscossa)
Teenage Mutant Ninja Turtles (TMNT – Tartarughe Ninja)
The Adventures of Sonic the Hedgehog (Le avventure di Sonic or Sonic)
The Flintstones (I Flintstones)
The Cleveland Show
The Looney Tunes Show
The Magic School Bus (Allacciate le cinture – Viaggiando si impara)
The Magician (Magician: la giustizia non è un trucco)
The New Batman Adventures (Batman, cavaliere della notte)
The Mask: The Animated Series (The Mask)
The New Archies (Zero in Condotta)
The New Woody Woodpecker Show (Picchiarello)
The Penguins of Madagascar (I pinguini di Madagascar)
The Real Ghostbusters
The Simpsons (I Simpson) (1998–present)
The Smurfs (I Puffi)
The Snorks (Gli Snorky)
The Spooktacular New Adventures of Casper (Casper)
The Super Mario Bros. Super Show! (Le avventure di Super Mario)
The Sylvester & Tweety Mysteries (I misteri di Silvestro e Titti)
The Twins of Destiny (I Gemelli del Destino)
The Wacky World of Tex Avery (Tex Avery Show)
Thomas the Tank Engine & Friends (Il Trenino Thomas)
Tiny Toon Adventures (I favolosi Tiny)
Tom and Jerry (Tom e Jerry)
Tom and Jerry Kids
Tom and Jerry Show
The Tom and Jerry Comedy Show
Tokyo Mew Mew (Tokyo Mew Mew - Amiche vincenti)
Totally Spies (Che magnifiche spie)
The Transformers
Twin Princess of Wonder Planet (Twin Princess - Principesse gemelle)
Transformers Animated
Transformers Prime
Vicky the Viking (Viki il Vichingo)
Widget the World Watcher (Widget, un alieno per amico)
Willy Fog 2 (Chi viene in viaggio con me?)
Wowser (Teodoro e l'invenzione che non-va)
W.I.T.C.H (Le super Witch)
The ZhuZhus (The Zhu Zhu Pets)
Yu-Gi-Oh!
Yu-Gi-Oh! Capsule Monsters (Yu-Gi-Oh! Grand Championship)
Zipi y Zape (Zip & Zap)

Show
Battiti Live
Candid Camera
 Cronache Marziane (Crónicas Marcianas)
 Cupido
 Distraction
 Fenomenal
 Festivalbar
 Frankenstein (The Big Experiment)
 Le Iene (Caiga Quien Caiga)
 Mai dire... (Never say...)
 Mercante in fiera (The Black Cat)
 Mistero
 Monster Jam
 Non è la Rai
 Sarabanda
 Saturday Night Live from Milano (Saturday Night Live, Italian version)
 Voglia!
 WWE Smackdown!

Reality shows
 Campioni, il sogno (2004–2006)
 La Fattoria (2004) (The Farm) broadcast by Canale 5 by 2005
 La Pupa e il Secchione (2006–2010, 2020-) (Beauty and the Geek)
 La Talpa (2004-2005-2008) (The Mole)
 Operazione Trionfo (2002) (Operación Triunfo)
 Popstars (2001, 2003) (Popstars)
 Saranno Famosi (2001) (from the 2nd season onwards the show's name was changed in Amici di Maria de Filippi (Fame) and broadcast by Canale 5)
 Survivor (2001) (Survivor)

Game shows
 La ruota della fortuna (Wheel of Fortune) (1980s–2003, 2006–present)
 OK, il prezzo è giusto! (The Price Is Right) (1980s–2001)
 Trasformat (2010–2011)
 Anello Debole (The Weakest Link) (2001)

Cancelled reality shows
 Comedy Club (2006, only one episode)
 Diario – Esperimento d'amore (2004, only four episodes)
 Personality (2003, Airs for the first time in 2 weeks)

News
 Lucignolo
 Studio Aperto

Sports
 Grand Prix motorcycle racing (until 2013)
 Superbike World Championship
 UEFA Champions League
 UEFA Europa League
 UEFA Super Cup
 Studio sport
 Internazionali di Tennis – Rome Tennis Master Series
 Super Bowl XLVIII
2018 FIFA World Cup

Directors of Italia 1

Network's faces
In the past Italia1 had its advertisers. As mentioned, the historical face of the network announcing the programs was Gabriella Golia, who has served for 20 years from 1982 to 2002 (Golia was also announcer of Antenna Nord). Veronica Ghinzani from 1982 to 1984, Manuela Blanchard Beillard in the early 1980s, Fiorella Pierobon from 1982 to 1984 (then official announcer of Canale 5), Licia Colò from 1982 to 1985. In 2002 Italia1 eliminated The figure of "Miss Goodnight" (the same thing happened in Canale 5 in December 2005).

The historic voice of Italia1's promo was Fabrizio Casadio, who announced them from 9 January 1984 to 5 October 1997. Since January 1, 2009, promotions are announced by Raffaele Farina.

References

External links
 Official Site 

Mediaset television channels
Television channels and stations established in 1982
Italian-language television stations